Surban may refer to:
 Surban, East Azerbaijan
 Surban, Kurdistan
 Surban, West Azerbaijan